That's All is an album by American singer Bobby Darin released in 1959 and arranged by Richard Wess. It was on the Billboard LP charts for 52 weeks and peaked at number seven. It also includes Darin's US No. 1 hit "Mack the Knife", which spent nine weeks at the top spot, and "Beyond the Sea", which was a Top 10 hit. At the second Grammy Awards (and the first to be televised), Darin won Record of the Year and Best New Singer.

Recording 
The first of several successful collaborations between Bobby Darin and arranger/conductor Richard Wess, That's All launched the young singer from the realm of teen pop into the adult market, and comparisons with Frank Sinatra. Publicist Harriet “Hesh” Wasser persuaded Wess to work with the twenty-two-year-old. Darin recorded "Mack the Knife" on December 19, 1958, and Ahmet Ertegun, founder of Atlantic Records, knew they had caught lightning in a bottle, later recalling:

Darin and Wess would team up again for This is Darin (1960), From Hello Dolly to Goodbye Charlie (1964), and Bobby Darin Sings the Shadow of Your Smile (1966).

Reception 

Music critic JT Griffith called That's All Darin's "most important record" in his Allmusic review, also writing it "broadened his appeal and secured his imortality [sic]... [It] might not be a new fan's first Darin purchase. However, it is an important release in the Rock and Roll Hall of Famer's career. This LP proves that not every rocker suffers the 'sophomore slump'." In an exploration of the evolution of "Mack the Knife", The Financial Times says:

Track listing

Side one
"Mack the Knife" (Bertolt Brecht, Kurt Weill) – 3:10
"Beyond the Sea" (Jack Lawrence, Charles Trenet) – 2:58
"Through a Long and Sleepless Night" (Mack Gordon, Alfred Newman) – 2:40
"Softly, as in a Morning Sunrise" (Oscar Hammerstein II, Sigmund Romberg) – 2:36
"She Needs Me" (Arthur Hamilton) – 3:32
"It Ain't Necessarily So" (George Gershwin, Ira Gershwin) – 3:26

Side two
"I'll Remember April" (Gene DePaul, Don Raye, Patricia Johnston) – 2:24
"That's the Way Love Is" (Bobby Darin) – 3:04
"Was There a Call for Me" (Woody Harris, Marty Holmes) – 3:11
"Some of These Days" (Shelton Brooks) – 2:44
"Where Is the One" (Eddie Finckel, Alec Wilder) – 3:30
"That's All" (Alan Brandt, Bob Haymes, Clyde Otis, Kelly Owens) – 2:02

Personnel

Musicians 
Richard Wess - arranger, conductor (of The Richard Wess Orchestra)
Hank Jones - piano
Barry Galbraith - guitar 
Milt Hinton - bass 
Osie Johnson - drums (Mack the Knife)
Don Lamond - drums 
Doc Severinsen - trumpet
Joe Cabot - trumpet
Al DeRisi - trumpet
Frank Rehak - trombone
Chauncey Welsch - trombone
Jerry Sanfino - tuba
Romeo Penque - flute, clarinet
Joe Soldo - flute

Technical 
Recording Engineers: Tom Dowd, Carl Lustig, Herb Kaplan, Heinz Kubicka
Cover photo: Tom Palumbo
Cover design: Marvin Israel
Supervision: Ahmet Ertegun, Nesuhi Ertegun, Jerry Wexler

References 

Bobby Darin albums
1959 albums
Albums produced by Ahmet Ertegun
Albums produced by Nesuhi Ertegun
Albums produced by Jerry Wexler
Atco Records albums